Ancud Volcanic Complex is a volcanic complex of Oligocene and Miocene age located around Ancud with exposures in Chiloé Island, the Chilean mainland and smaller islets. Three subunits are recognized in the complex: Hueihuen, Teguaco and Cocotue. The complex is part of the mid-Tertiary coastal magmatic belt in south-central Chile.

See also 

 Parga Formation
 Santo Domingo Formation

References 

Geologic formations of Chile
Miocene South America
Oligocene South America
Oligocene volcanism
Miocene volcanism
Paleogene Chile
Neogene Chile
Volcanoes of Los Lagos Region
Geology of Los Lagos Region
Chiloé Archipelago